Johnny Woo may refer to:

 Johnny Woo (comics), appearing in 2000 AD comics and Judge Dredd Megazine
 Jonny Woo (comedian), cult British comedian